1st Avenue Mall is a shopping mall in George Town, Penang, Malaysia. It is located at Magazine Road, next to Komtar and Prangin Mall, and is linked to both buildings via overhead bridges.

Development
Initially planned as Phase 4 of the Komtar project, 1st Avenue Mall was eventually developed by a private developer and opened to the public in 2010. Upon its completion, it competes directly against the adjacent Prangin Mall and has since attracted a variety of well-known international fashion brands, including H&M, Skechers, Cotton On and Victoria's Secret.

Facilities
At present, the mall has two anchor tenants - Parkson and TGV Cinemas. The latter operates a cineplex at the top floor of the shopping mall, also dubbed as Cloud 8.

1st Avenue Mall has a total of seven retail floors (LG - L4 & L8), including a sub-basement level, and three multistorey carpark levels (L5 - L7)

Retail outlets 

One of the two main anchor tenants of 1st Avenue Mall, was Parkson, occupies 95,000 sq ft of the first four floors within the mall. However, it had shut down due to COVID-19 financial difficulties. Other than Parkson, the major fashion names that have set up outlets within 1st Avenue Mall include H&M, Skechers, Cotton On, Victoria's Secret, Giordano, Charles & Keith and Hush Puppies. 

In addition, there are a number of restaurants, cafes and beverage outlets within 1st Avenue Mall, including Texas Chicken, Starbucks, Baskin-Robbins, Kenny Rogers Roasters and Chatime.

Entertainment 
1st Avenue Mall is home to a variety of entertainment options. The main anchor tenant of the mall, TGV Cinemas, operates an eight-screen cineplex at Cloud 8, the top floor of the shopping mall. At the time of its launching, it was the first TGV Cinemas outlet in Penang Island.

Other entertainment outlets within the mall include an amusement centre (KB Fun) and a karaoke joint (Red Box). The amusement centre is located besides the S&J Co. gift shop at 3rd floor, while the karaoke joint shares the Cloud 8 with the TGV Cineplex.

Location and access
1st Avenue Mall's location at the heart of George Town, right next to the Rapid Penang bus terminal in Komtar, makes it easily accessible to locals and tourists alike. One can take the free-of-charge Rapid Penang CAT bus from anywhere within George Town's UNESCO World Heritage Site to get to 1st Avenue Mall. As most Rapid Penang bus routes on Penang Island pass through the Komtar bus terminal, 1st Avenue Mall can also be reached via any Rapid Penang bus heading to Komtar.

See also 
 Komtar
 List of shopping malls in Malaysia

External links 
 1st Avenue Mall

References 

Shopping malls established in 2010
Shopping malls in Penang
2010 establishments in Malaysia
Buildings and structures in George Town, Penang